Bonnie and Clyde is a 2003 collaboration album by Messy Marv and Marvaless.

Track listing
"Intro" - 0:50
"Waitin on You" - 4:40
"Real P.I." - 3:33
"What You Want" - 4:15
"I am Rap" - 4:14
"In the Traffic" - 3:55
"La Familia" - 4:42
"Goin Thru Some Thangs" - 4:41
"Off Top" - 3:35
"The World Is Ghetto" - 4:33
"Bitch Niggaz" - 4:38
"Outro" - 0:50
"Don't Hate on This" - 4:00

References

2003 albums
Messy Marv albums
Depictions of Bonnie and Clyde in music
Marvaless albums